Thomas or Tom Lockyer may refer to:
Tom Lockyer (born 1994), Welsh footballer
 Tom Lockyer (cricketer) (1826–1869), English cricketer
Thomas Lockyer (MP) (1699–1785), English politician
Thomas Lockyer (actor) in The Commander (TV series) etc.